Type 803 torpedo retriever is a type of naval auxiliary ship currently in service with the People's Liberation Army Navy (PLAN). Construction begun in October 1960 at the 425th Factory of PLAN, the predecessor of current Wuhu Shipyard, and the first ship was launched on March 15, 1963. Sea trials begun on May 11, 1963 and the first unit was finally handed over to PLAN on December 24, 1963 at Lüshun. However, delivery of subsequent units have been delayed due to political turmoil in China at the time, namely, the Cultural Revolution, so it was not until 1977, when the originally planned total of six units had finally been completed, including two foreign sales, one for Tanzania, and another for Cambodia. Specification:
Displacement	93.17 long tons (94.67 t)
Length:	29.85 m (97 ft 11 in)
Beam: 5.98 m (19 ft 7 in)
Draft: 1.56 m (5 ft 1 in)
Depth: 2.98 m (9 ft 9 in)
Propulsion:	2 × M50-3 marine diesel engines, with 2 shafts
Speed:	18 knots (33 km/h; 21 mph)
Range: 228 nmi (422 km; 262 mi)
Armament: 25 mm (0.98 in) or 37 mm (1.5 in) guns

References

Auxiliary ships of the People's Liberation Army Navy